A third season and final was announced in August 2010. The first show was broadcast on 21 August 2010. The third series aired on RTÉ One, it was hosted by Gráinne Seoige. This series was produced by Tyrone Productions.

Once again prize money of €50,000 was awarded to the eventual winner of the show; who was Daniel Furlong, with Bláthnaid the winning judge. The result also marked the third time a child act won the show, following The Mulkerrin Brothers and Chloe Coyle in the previous two series'.

This was the final series. The All Ireland Talent Show was replaced by The Voice of Ireland, a part of  The Voice TV series.

Personnel

Presenters
Gráinne Seoige returned as presenter in her only role on the channel. Aidan Power & Dustin returned to present The All Ireland Talent Show Backstage on RTÉ Two

Judges
Original Dublin judge, Shane Lynch announced his departure from the show. Amanda Brunker took his place. The judges for this series are: Amanda Brunker (Dublin), 1970 Eurovision Song Contest winner and conservative politician Dana (North), broadcaster John Creedon (South), television presenter and Irish language enthusiast Bláthnaid Ní Chofaigh (East) and television personality and weather forecaster Dáithí Ó Sé (West). Backstage presenter Aidan Power filled in for Bláthnaid during the heat six results show as she was ill.

Auditions

West Auditions

 Head judge:
Dáithí Ó Sé
Assistant judges: 
Síle Seoige & Pádraic Breathnach
Final eight:
Aoife and Paul Moroney
Karate Pencil Case
Jacks Angels
Sean Nós ar an tSionnan
Cosa Beoga
Richard Cunningham
Politically Correct
Don Stiffe

East Auditions

Head judge:
Bláthnaid Ní Chofaigh
Assistant judges:
Cormac Battle & Brenda Donahue
Final eight:
Jackson 3
Lil' Dukebox
Daniel Furlong
The Myth
Claire Mulholland
Arlene Caffrey
Feverfelt
Bernadette Spain

Dublin Auditions

Head judge:
Amanda Brunker
Assistant judges:
Shane Lynch and Larry Gogan
Final eight:
Kyle Kennedy
Anthony White
Wallis Hamilton
Dan Dennehy
Owen Gerrard
Shauna Buckingham
Must Try D 'N' D
Síle Keogh

South Auditions

Head judge:John CreedonAssistant judges:Emma O'Driscoll & Joe O'SheaFinal eight: Seamus & Tomas HaloJohnny MackMad 4 RoadDarragh MerritFitzy Chicks2 Day NationShane Doonan

North Auditions

Head judge:DanaAssistant judges:Joe Lindsay & Majella O'DonnellFinal eight:The Virginia Gospel ChoirÁine HassanFox 'N' CrewLouise FlorenceBrian SheerinThe Ward SistersMaggie FerrisJim Devine

Live Heats
Each heat five contestants would take the stage. One representing each judge and region of Ireland. The judges would score an act after their performance and then the act with the highest score would gain 5 points and the second highest scoring act would gain 4 points etc. The same would be done with the public vote. The scores would then be added and the act with the most combined score would gain first place and advance to the semi-finals.(In the event of a tie the act with the most viewer votes would take higher ranking.) From the 2nd and 3rd placed acts the judges would choose an act to send through to the wildcard show.

Contestants

Live Heats summary

Heat 1 (31 December) 

Judges' votes to send through to the wildcard show
Amanda Brunker: The Virginia Gospel Choir
Dáithí Ó Sé: Johnny Mack
Bláthnaid Ní Chofaigh: Virginia Gospel Choir

The Virginia Gospel Choir were sent to the wildcard show with 2-1 majority.

Heat 2 (9 January)  

Judges' votes to send through to the wildcard show
Amanda Brunker: Karate Pencil Case
John Creedon: Louise Florence
Bláthnaid Ní Chofaigh: Karate Pencil Case

Karate Pencil Case were sent to the wildcard show with 2-1 majority.

Heat 3 (16 January) 
Guest Performer: Tommy Fleming

Judges' votes to send through to the wildcard show
Bláthnaid Ní Chofaigh: Wallis Hamilton
Dáithí Ó Sé: Wallis Hamilton
Dana: was not required to vote as there was already a majority

Wallis Hamilton was sent to the wildcard show with 2-0 majority.

Heat 4 (23 January) 
Guest Performer: The High Kings

Judges' votes to send through to the wildcard show
Amanda Brunker: Darragh Merritt
Dana: Darragh Merritt
Bláthnaid Ní Chofaigh: was not required to vote as there was already a majority

Darragh Merritt was sent to the wildcard show with 2-0 majority

Heat 5 (30 January)  
Guest Performer: Imelda May

Judges' votes to send through to the wildcard show
Amanda Brunker: Aine Hassin
Dáithí Ó Sé: Shane Doonan
Bláthnaid Ní Chofaigh: Shane Doonan - initially refused to vote and wanted to revert to the public vote, as she had given both acts the same score. However she was told this was not an option and voted.

Shane Doonan was sent to the wildcard show with 2-1 majority.

Heat 6 (6 February) 
Guest Performer: Shayne Ward
 Bláthnaid Ní Chofaigh was present for the first show but was not present for the results show as she was ill. Backstage presenter Aidan Power filled in for her.

Judges' votes to send through to the wildcard show
John Creedon:Shauna Buckingham
Dana: Shauna Buckingham
Aidan Power: was not required to vote as there was already a majority

Shauna Buckingham was sent to the wildcard show with 2-0 majority

Heat 7 (13 February)
Guest Performer: Majella O'Donnell featuring Daniel O'Donnell

Judges' votes to send through to the wildcard show
Amanda Brunker: Daniel Furlong
John Creedon: Daniel Furlong
Dáithí O'Sé : was not required to vote as there was already a majority

Daniel Furlong was sent to the wildcard show with 2-0 majority

Heat 8 (20 February)  
Guest Performer: Frankie Gavin with De Dannan

Judges' votes to send through to the wildcard show
Dana: Claire Mulholland
Amanda Brunker: Claire Mulholland
John Creedon:was not required to vote as there was already a majority

Claire Mulholland was sent to the wildcard show with 2-0 majority

2 Day Nation received the highest judges vote in the three-year history of the show.

Wildcard Heat (27 February)
Guest Performer: Miracle Bell

Semi-finals

Semi-final 1 (6 March) 
Guest Performer: Sharon Shannon

Semi-final 2 (13 March) 
Guest Performer: The Wanted

Final (20 March) 
Guest Performer: Olly Murs 
Final Six
For the first time in the history of The All Ireland Talent Show the final had two stages. During the first show all six finalists performed and lines opened after the last act performed.

 Final Showdown
At the start of the results show the lines were frozen and the three least popular acts were eliminated. The lines then re-opened with all votes cast earlier still counting. The three remaining acts performed again performing a shorter version of the songs they sang in the live heats.

References

2010 Irish television seasons
2011 Irish television seasons
3